The 2005 Men's EuroHockey Nations Championship was the tenth edition of the Men's EuroHockey Nations Championship, the biennial international men's field hockey championship of Europe organized by the European Hockey Federation. It was held on the complex of the hockey club ATV Leipzig in Leipzig, Germany from 28 August to 4 September 2005. 

For the first time, there were just eight teams competing instead of twelve. From 2005 on the competition has been held every two years, while the lower-ranked teams got their own championship, divided into a Nations Trophy ("B"-nations) and a Nations Challenge ("C"-nations).

Spain won their second title by defeating the Netherlands 4–2 in the final. The hosts and four-time defending champions Germany won the bronze medal by defeating Belgium 9–1.

Squads

Results
All times are Central European Summer Time (UTC +2)

Pool A

Pool B

Fifth to eighth place classification

5–8th place semi-finals

Seventh place game

Fifth place game

First to fourth place classification

Semi-finals

Third place game

Final

Final standings

See also
2005 Men's EuroHockey Nations Trophy
2005 Women's EuroHockey Nations Championship

External links
Official website
Eurohockey Nations Championship Men Leipzig (GER) from eurohockey.org

 
Men's EuroHockey Nations Championship
Men 1
Eurohockey Nations Championship Men
International field hockey competitions hosted by Germany
Sports competitions in Leipzig
Eurohockey Nations Championship Men
Eurohockey Nations Championship Men
EuroHockey Nations Championship